Klára Moravcová (born 19 March 1983 in Ústí nad Orlicí) is a Czech cross-country skier and biathlete.
She competed at the 2014 Winter Olympics in Sochi, in the 10 km, skiathlon, relay and 30 km.

Cross-country skiing results
All results are sourced from the International Ski Federation (FIS).

Olympic Games

World Championships

World Cup

Season standings

References

External links

1983 births
Living people
Cross-country skiers at the 2014 Winter Olympics
Czech female cross-country skiers
Czech female biathletes
Olympic cross-country skiers of the Czech Republic
People from Ústí nad Orlicí
Sportspeople from the Pardubice Region